Lorenzo Fontana (born 28 August 1996) is an Italian rower.

He won a silver medal in the Lightweight Men's Quadruple Sculls category at the 2019 World Rowing Championships.

References

External links

1996 births
Living people
Italian male rowers
World Rowing Championships medalists for Italy